Ever Milton Cantero Benítez (born 3 December 1985) is a Paraguayan footballer who last played for Guaireña in Paraguay.

Club career
Cantero began his career playing for River Plate of his country in 2003, after signed by Cerro de Franco and General Caballero, also of his country.

Cantero arrives to Chile on the year 2006, to play por Club de Deportes Puerto Montt in this team he made a good tournament and made than Universidad Catolica was interested him, he was signed with this team, but not accepted him, because it had not passed the medical examinations.

Later, Cantero signed for Palestino, in when remained one year, after signed for Ñublense, in when he made a good tournament, scoring six goals for the league, one of this goals was scoring to Colo-Colo, in a result of 1-0 in the 18th minute. In the second semester of 2008, Cantero scored four goals for the league and one goal for Copa Chile.

In 2009, Cantero signed for O'Higgins, but one month later Cantero go out of the club for personal problems, and later signed for Cobreloa, in this club Cantero not made a good tournament as in the other tournament, his club ended in 10th position and scored five goals, in the second semester was worse his club ended in the 14th position, and just scored two goals.

Honours

Club
 Cobresal
 Primera División de Chile (1): 2015 Clausura

References

External links
 Apertura 2008 Statistics

1985 births
Living people
Paraguayan footballers
Paraguayan expatriate footballers
Paraguayan Primera División players
Chilean Primera División players
Primera B de Chile players
Bolivian Primera División players
General Caballero Sport Club footballers
River Plate (Asunción) footballers
Club Deportivo Palestino footballers
Cobreloa footballers
Cobresal footballers
Ñublense footballers
Puerto Montt footballers
Santiago Morning footballers
Club Bolívar players
Expatriate footballers in Chile
Expatriate footballers in Bolivia
Association football forwards